"Boiler" is a song by the American rap rock band Limp Bizkit. It was released in July 2001 as the fifth and final single from their third studio album Chocolate Starfish and the Hot Dog Flavored Water. Guitar World described the song as "an old-school, L.L. Cool J.-style rap ballad".

There was a limited edition Gold numbered version of this single that includes DVD music videos from the band. The music video was directed by David Meyers and Fred Durst, and filmed in Portugal.

The song peaked at 30 on Modern Rock charts.

Music video
The video begins by panning down a long hallway being vacuumed by one person but is otherwise deserted before entering a room in the building in which both doors are open. In the room the video shows a woman in a bikini in an apartment looking in the mirror with Fred Durst watching her. Then she turns around and opens her mouth and spits out a mechanical arm holding a levitating bomb that is aimed in Durst's direction, causing Durst to jump out of the window and then blows up the whole apartment. Durst then goes to a burger stand called Bolacha Mole (which is Portuguese for Limp Biscuit), where he sits next to a person with a scar under his eye, across from Wes Borland, whose head falls off. Durst starts to eat his burger, but discovers that it is crawling with worms. After this, a car crashes into the stand and it explodes. This section was filmed in the Praça de São Paulo, in downtown Lisbon, Portugal.

Durst wakes up in a bed with a woman who starts to kiss him, and then he pulls off the wig that she was wearing to discover that she has plugs all over her shaved head. Looking around, he discovers that there were dozens of couples kissing and having sex in similar beds. Prompted by this revelation, he starts to run away. While running, Durst turns into a cartoon and is chased by an army of humans with round bellies, and a sea of hot dogs (all resembling the Chocolate Starfish album's cover art) which turns into a giant sea monster that tries to kill him. After escaping, he changes back into his real form by ripping the cartoon character apart to reveal himself again and jumps onto a stage with the rest of the band. The stage is located in the center of the galleries of "Mãe d'Água" in Lisbon, Portugal, part of the Águas Livres Aqueduct. The Mãe d'Água (Mother of the Water) reservoir of the Amoreiras, the largest of the water reservoirs, was finished in 1834. This reservoir, with a capacity of 5,500 m³ of water, was designed by Carlos Mardel. It is now deactivated and can be visited as part of the Museu da Água (Water Museum), which is in a temple where several dark monsters try to get to them and many sparks fly onto the stage. After the band finishes performing the song, Durst drops his hat on the ground and walks away.

This was the final music video to feature guitarist Wes Borland due to him leaving the band in October of that same year (Borland has since returned). Parts of the music video are a clear homage to Pink Floyd's The Wall. The opening scene, the conveyor belt of people falling into a hole and being made into sausages, and the use of worms are all very similar to parts of the epic Wall movie. The video was banned from MTV due to the scene where couples are having sex and the scene where Wes Borland's head falls off.

Reception
In 2022, Louder Sound and Kerrang ranked the song number four and number seven, respectively, on their lists of Limp Bizkit's greatest songs.

Track listing
 "Boiler"
 "Faith"
 "My Way" (DJ Premier remix)
 "My Way" (P. Diddy remix)
 "Boiler" (video)

Charts

Release history

References

External links
 

2001 singles
Limp Bizkit songs
Songs written by Wes Borland
Songs written by Fred Durst
2000 songs
Flip Records (1994) singles
Interscope Records singles
Music videos directed by Fred Durst
Songs written by Sam Rivers (bassist)
Songs written by John Otto (drummer)
Song recordings produced by Josh Abraham
Music videos directed by Dave Meyers (director)